Anthem: Homunculus is a podcast written by John Cameron Mitchell and Bryan Weller. The show was produced by Topic Studios and released exclusively on Luminary.

Background 
The podcast debuted on April 23, 2019. The show was written by John Cameron Mitchell and Bryan Weller. The story was written while Mitchell and Weller were staying at William S. Burroughs's house in Lawrence, Kansas. The podcast was produced by Topic Studios and released exclusively on Luminary. The podcast is a ten episode series that is over six hours in total. The podcast was supposed to be a sequel to Hedwig and the Angry Inch. Mitchell and Weller initially pitched the idea for television, but they were turned down so they decided to create a podcast instead. The show is a podcast musical that includes 31 songs that span multiple genres. The soundtrack for the podcast was released on May 20, 2019. The podcast had a live marathon listening party at the IFC Center on November 24, 2019 and later did another live listening party on January 19, 2020 in partnership with the Austin Film Society. The cast featured performances by Cynthia Erivo, Denis O'Hare, Glenn Close, Laurie Anderson, Marion Cotillard, Nakhane, and Patti LuPone.

Reception 
The Guardian included the show on their list of the best podcasts of 2019 saying that the show "is a heartrending and hilarious combination of music, theatre and drama". The Atlantic included the show on their list of the best podcasts of 2019 saying that the show has "superbly rendered dialogue". The podcast was an honoree in the scripted fiction category during the 2020 Webby Awards.

References

External links 
 

Audio podcasts
2021 podcast debuts
2021 podcast endings
Scripted podcasts
American podcasts
American musicals
2021 musicals
Musical theatre podcasts